Nchara is an agrarian community in Oloko, Ikwuano Local Government Area, Abia State, Nigeria. It is composed of two sister villages namely; Akanu and Otoro. Afa Ukwu is the autonomous community of Nchara. It is about 24 km away from the state capital, Umuahia.

History
Nchara is situated at a crossway point to different parts of Igboland and the Efik-Ibibio communities. This has made it a major carrefour for Igbo and Ibibio commuters alike.

The Aba Women's Riot has its share of history with Nchara in the sense that one of the apex leaders of the riot, Madam Ikonna Nwanyiukwu Enyia (b. 1877) who was originally from the Oloko village, married a man from Nchara. In fact, the Aba Women's Riot did not take place in Aba but in Nchara. This misinterpretation was caused by the warping of history by previous governmental powers. There have been calls from the Oloko people for the government to officially recognize Oloko as the authentic place of the riot.

In the past, the paramount Ezes of Oloko clan in Eze Otutubuike and Eze Pipi came from Nchara. Elder Dr. Gabriel Onyeonoro Arungwa, one of Ikwuano's first foreign-trained citizens hailed from Umuncheke in Otoro Nchara.

Nchara and her Annang neighbors have both been involved in communal clashes with each other over the control of land.

Economy and infrastructure
Being an agricultural hub, Nchara has been an economically important region to Ikwuano. The soil of Nchara is fertile for the cultivation of commercial crops such as yams, cassava, plantains and even common fruits like bananas, oranges and watermelons. Farmers from Nchara sell their produce in neighboring villages such as Ndoro, Ariam and to their Annang neighbors in Akwa Ibom State. Their agricultural prowess has made them buoyant enough to feed themselves. Despite this, Nchara's development is plodding.

See also
• Aba Women's Riot

References

Populated places in Abia State